Eldol was Consul or Count of Gloucester in Geoffrey of Monmouth's circa 1136 work Historia Regum Britanniae (The History of the Kings of Britain).  In this pseudohistory he was the sole British leader to escape from the massacre of Salisbury, to which Hengist had invited all of the British Leaders to a peace treaty.  When all of the leaders were there, about 460 in number, Hengest ordered his men to draw their long knives and kill every leader.  Vortigern was spared, but every other ruler was slain, save Eldol, who grabbed a stick up off the ground and killed 70 men in his escape.

After the massacre, Eldol was a key supporter of Aurelius Ambrosius and helped him defeat the Saxons.  Eldol defeated Hengist in hand-to-hand combat at the battle at Kaerconan/Cunungeburc, which may be the town of Conisbrough, and beheaded him.  He was also at the siege of Vortigern's tower.  Eldad, Bishop of Gloucester, was his brother.

Thomas Rudge gives an account in his 1811 The History and Antiquities of Gloucester:

Eldol, or Edel, a Briton, is said to have been Earl of Gloucester in 461; he was, according to the account of Robert of Gloucester, and other historians, a knight of great prowess. He attended King Vortigern at the treaty of Ambresbury in Wiltshire, to which they were invited by Hengist, the Saxon, with the express stipulation that neither party should go thither armed; but the Saxons having, contrary to their engagement, concealed long knives under their clothes, murdered great numbers of the Britons. Eldol is said at this time to have exerted himself so powerfully with a stake he happened to find, as to slay no less than seventy of the Saxons, and after having disabled many more, he escaped to Gloucester, his own city. He is also said to have behaved with uncommon courage, in a subsequent battle between Ambrosius, King of the Britons, and Hengist, when ... he rushed through the Pagan army, took Hengist prisoner, and cut off his head.  

It is not stated whether Morvid, Consul of Gloucester during King Arthur's reign in the Historia Regum Britanniae, is related to Eldol.

In later Welsh legend, Eldol became Eidol or Eidiol 'Gadarn' ('Mighty'), recorded as one of the three strong men of Britain, having, at the meeting on Salisbury plain, slain 660 Saxons with a billet of wood.

There was a Welsh hero Eidiol mentioned in The Gododdin who may have inspired the use of the name in Geoffrey's work.

He should not be confused with King Eldol who lives generations earlier in Geoffrey's work.

In popular culture 

Eldol and Eldad have minor roles in the 1970 novel The Crystal Cave by Mary Stewart. After the battle with Hengist, one of Ambrosius's men says to Merlin, "... old Eldad laid about him [i.e., fought well] with the best of them. Did you see him?" Merlin replies wryly, "I heard him."

References

British traditional history
People from Gloucester
Year of birth missing
Year of death missing